Alessandro Rimessi (born 4 August 1937) is an Italian racing cyclist. He rode in the 1962 Tour de France.

References

1937 births
Living people
Italian male cyclists
Place of birth missing (living people)